The bullseye round stingray (Urobatis concentricus), also known as the reticulated round ray, or spot-on-spot round ray, is a species of cartilaginous fish in the family Urotrygonidae. It is endemic to Mexico.  Its natural habitats are shallow seas, subtidal aquatic beds, coral reefs, estuarine waters, intertidal marshes, and coastal saline lagoons. It is threatened by habitat loss.

Description
The bullseye round stingray has a venomous spine on its tail. It feeds on crustaceans, small fishes, and worms.

References

External links
 

bullseye round stingray
Fish of the Gulf of California
Fish of Mexican Pacific coast
bullseye round stingray
Taxonomy articles created by Polbot